Rona, Inc. (stylized as RONA) is a Canadian retailer of home improvement and construction products and services, owned by U.S.-based private equity firm Sycamore Partners. Founded in 1939, the company operates a mixture of company-owned and franchised retailers under multiple banners, including Rona, its big box formats Rona Home & Garden (Rona L’Entrepôt in Quebec) and Réno-Dépôt, as well as smaller brands such as Rona Cashway, Marcil Centre de Rénovation, Moffatt & Powell and Dick's Lumber. Some stores currently operate under the Lowe's banner but will be gradually rebranded as Rona in 2023.

Lowe's acquired Rona for $3.2 billion CAD in May 2016. In November 2022, Lowe's announced it would sell its Canadian operations, including Rona, to Sycamore Partners; the deal was completed the following February.

History
In September 1939, Rona was founded as "Les Marchands en Quincaillerie" (The Merchants of Hardware), an alliance of independent Montreal-area hardware retailers who sought the buying power to bypass wholesalers and deal directly with manufacturers. On July 20, 1960, the Ro-Na name was adopted, named after Rolland Dansereau and Napoleon Piotte, two of the founders of Les Marchands en Quincaillerie. Ro-Na member stores begin adding the Ro-Na logo to identify themselves as members of the buying co-operative.

In 1982, Rona purchased the assets of Botanix. In 1984, Rona created a purchasing alliance with Ontario-based Home Hardware Stores Ltd. through Alliance Rona Home Inc. In 1988, Rona merged with Dismat, another building materials company, to create Rona Dismat Group Inc. In 1990, Rona formed an alliance with Hardware Wholesalers, Inc. of Fort Wayne, Indiana. Appointment in 1992 of Robert Dutton as President and CEO of RONA. In 1997, ITM Entreprises S.A., a France-based group, invests $30 million in the Rona Dismat Group Inc. ITM became a shareholder and created a purchasing alliance with Rona.

In 1998, Rona stopped using the Le Quincailleur and Dismat names and introduced Rona L'express, Rona L'express Matériaux and Rona Le Rénovateur Régional. Rona also changed its name from Rona Dismat Group Inc. to Rona Inc. In 1999,  Rona opened a new warehouse adjacent to its headquarters, measuring 654,000 square feet (ca. 6 ha), doubling its warehousing capacity. In the year 2000, Rona acquired Ontario-based Cashway Building Centres, with 66 stores. In the same year, Rona opened its online store on the rona.ca website. In 2001, Rona acquired 51 Revy Home and Garden (based in British Columbia), Revelstoke Home Centres (located in Western Canada) and Lansing (based in Ontario) stores, thus owning many more stores in the Greater Toronto Area.

In 2002, Rona closed a public offering consisting of a total offering of $150.1 million in common shares. Rona's common shares are traded on the Toronto Stock Exchange under the symbol "RON". In 2003, Rona acquired Réno-Dépôt Inc. from British Kingfisher plc, including The Building Box stores. Rona also opened its third large distribution centre in Calgary, Alberta. In 2004, Rona acquired Totem Building Supplies Limited, an Alberta company. Rona also joined the Air Miles Award Program the same year, allowing customers to gain Air Miles points while shopping at the store. Two TV shows sponsored by RONA, Rona Dream Home and Ma Maison Rona were released in 2004.

In 2006, Rona acquired Stephens Home Centre/Castle Inc, a company based in Sydney, Nova Scotia. Rona also acquired a majority (51%) stake in Matériaux Coupal Inc as well as Curtis Lumber Building Supplies and Chester Dawe Limited, a company based in St. John's, Newfoundland and Labrador. In 2007, Rona acquired Dick's Lumber, a company based in Burnaby, British Columbia. In 2007, Rona acquired Noble Trade, a company based in Concord, Ontario. In 2009, My Rona Home first aired. In 2010, Rona acquired Pierceys, a company based in Nova Scotia, Plomberie Payette & Perreault, a company based in Boucherville, Quebec, Moffatt & Powell, a company based in London, Ontario, Don Park Canada, and TruServ.

In 2012, the U.S. hardware store chain Lowe's attempted to buy Rona; however, the deal was met with objections from Rona shareholders (particularly the Caisse de dépôt et placement du Québec) and franchisees, and was eventually called off. On February 3, 2016, Rona announced that it had accepted an offer to be acquired by Lowe's for CDN$3.2 billion, pending regulatory and shareholder approval. Post-merger, Lowe's plans to maintain Rona's retail banners, and "continue to employ the vast majority of its current employees and maintain key executives from Rona's strong leadership team". Lowe's Canada will be operated from Rona's headquarters in Boucherville, but remain under the leadership of its current CEO Sylvain Prud'homme. The purchase was closed in May 2016. In December 2016, Lowe's announced that it planned to convert selected Rona-branded stores to the Lowe's brand.

In 2019, acting upon a public complaint, Advertising Standards Canada ruled that Rona's continued display of signage such as "Truly Canadian" and "Proudly Canadian" on storefronts following the sale to the American-based Lowe's was misleading. Rona subsequently removed the signage.

In November 2022, Lowe's agreed to sell its Canadian operations to the American private equity firm Sycamore Partners, which also operates, among other properties, Staples Canada. Lowe's Canada has indicated that, subsequent to the sale, the remaining Lowe's stores in Canada – some of which had been previously rebranded from Rona to Lowe's – will be eventually renamed Rona. The sale was completed on February 3, 2023.

Retail operations
Rona is a participant in the voluntary Scanner Price Accuracy Code managed by the Retail Council of Canada.

Big box stores

In the 1990s, under competitive pressure from big box retailers such as The Home Depot and Lowe's, Rona established the Rona Home & Garden stores.

Faced with chronic under-performance in some markets outside of Quebec, Rona closed six big box stores in 2012, five in Ontario and one in British Columbia.

While the Home Depot and Lowe's stores are all company owned, Rona Home & Garden stores are a combination of corporately owned and franchised, despite the massive investment required to build such a store. As big box home improvement stores entered the market, Rona countered by bringing together successful owners of small Rona affiliate stores in Quebec to invest in one or more big box format stores. Many Rona Home & Garden locations in that province thus have local ownership, a tradition of the family hardware store, and a great deal of flexibility to adapt to the market at the store level. Most of Rona's big-box format stores in the rest of Canada are entirely corporate-owned.

In December 2016, Lowe's Canada announced that 40 large-format Rona stores outside of Quebec would be rebranded under the Lowe's name, as part of an effort to re-position the Rona brand for mid-size stores. This would be reversed following the sale to Sycamore in 2023.

TV shows

Rona Dream Home 
Rona Dream Home hosted by Caroline Redekopp was a Canadian reality television series, which debuted in 2004 on Global.

The shows follow two families have ten weeks to turn a house into a dream home. The winner, chosen by viewers, is awarded the home they built.

The show lasted two seasons. Season 1 ran from March to May in 2004 and season 2 ran from April to June in 2005. Season 1 had 10 episodes and season 2 had 9.

Ma Maison Rona 
Ma Maison Rona was a French Canadian reality television series, which debuted in 2004 on French language channel TVA. The show was the French counterpart to Rona Dream Home.

The show has two families compete to build the best house for $100,000 over the course of 10 weeks. Each week, the family complete one room and impress the viewers of the show, who have the final vote. Each team is assigned a contractor, designer, and foreman, with input from family members allowed. The winning family keeps the house they made plus an additional $400,000 while the losing family wins a $25,000 down payment on a home.

The show was produced by Zone 3 and lasted until 2009, with a total of 7 seasons.

My Rona Home 
My Rona Home was a Canadian reality television series, which debuted in October 2009 on Citytv.

Hosted by Elissa Lansdell and sponsored by Rona and The Brick furniture chain, the series pits two Alberta families against each other in a competition to design and build a dream home. At the end of the ten-week contest, the winning family is awarded the home they built. The series was based on the previous TV shows RONA Dream Home and Ma maison RONA.

Season 2 of the show first aired in April 2011. Season 2 was the last season.

References

External links
 
 Rona Inc. corporate website

Lowe's
Hardware stores of Canada
Retail companies established in 1939
Companies based in Boucherville
1939 establishments in Quebec
Companies formerly listed on the Toronto Stock Exchange
Canadian subsidiaries of foreign companies
2002 initial public offerings
2016 mergers and acquisitions